Jeff Kushner (born May 4, 1965) is a Film Editor, Supervising Sound Editor and educator who has worked in various post production positions since 1987. He also taught film history and sound design at the Los Angeles Film School between 2005 and 2008.

Selected filmography 
Editing and Supervising Sound credits include Sling Blade, Frogs for Snakes, Harold & Kumar Go to White Castle, Drowning Mona and I Hope They Serve Beer in Hell.
His dialogue, sound effects, ADR and/or Foley credits include the television shows Law and Order: Special Victims Unit, House M.D., Crossing Jordan and 30 Rock. His feature credits include Unfaithful, Mystery Men, Behind Enemy Lines, and Agent Cody Banks.

Additional information 
He has also been credited as Jeffrey Kushner, Jeffrey A. Kushner and Russell Creak.

He studied acting at the Royal Academy of Dramatic Art in 1982.

External links 
 
 

1965 births
American film editors
Living people